Other notable people share this name. See Thomas Lynch (disambiguation).

Thomas Lynch (November 21, 1844May 4, 1898) was an American lawyer and Democratic politician from the U.S. state of Wisconsin.  He served two terms in the United States House of Representatives, representing Wisconsin's 9th congressional district.  He was also the first mayor of Antigo, Wisconsin, and served two terms in the Wisconsin State Assembly.

Biography

Thomas Lynch was born on November 21, 1844, in the town of Granville, Milwaukee County, in the Wisconsin Territory.  He was educated in the common schools in Milwaukee County, then moved to the town of Chilton, Wisconsin, in Calumet County, in 1864, and purchased a farm.

In the Spring of 1867 he was elected to the town board of supervisor—winning his election by just 1 vote.  The next year he was elected chairman of the town board; he was then re-elected in that office in 1869 and 1870.  In 1871, he began teaching school while studying law.

In 1872, he was elected to his first term in the Wisconsin State Assembly, representing all of Calumet County.  He was elected running as an Independent candidate, but caucused as a Democrat after joining the 26th Wisconsin Legislature.

After the legislative session, in the spring of 1873, he was elected chairman of both his town board and the Calumet County board of supervisors.  In 1874, he attended the University of Wisconsin Law School in Madison, Wisconsin, to complete his legal education.  He graduated the following year and was admitted to the bar.  He immediately returned to Calumet County and formed a law partnership with Calumet's incumbent district attorney John E. McMullen, known as McMullen & Lynch.  In 1878 he was elected as successor to McMillan as district attorney, and served two terms.

In 1882, rather than running for another term as district attorney, he ran for election to the Assembly, and was elected to serve in the 36th Wisconsin Legislature.

After the end of the 1883 legislative session, he moved north to Antigo, Wisconsin, in Langlade County.  When Antigo was incorporated as a city, Lynch was elected the first mayor.  He was subsequently elected to another term as mayor in 1888.

In 1890, he was chosen as the Democratic Party nominee for United States House of Representatives in Wisconsin's 9th congressional district, which then comprised nearly all of northern Wisconsin—Ashland, Chippewa, Door, Florence, Forest, Langlade, Lincoln, Marathon, Marinette, Oconto, Oneida, Portage, Price, Sawyer, Shawano, Taylor, Waupaca, and Wood counties.  At the general election, he defeated incumbent Republican congressman Myron H. McCord.  He went on to win re-election in 1892 and served in the Fifty-second and Fifty-third Congresses (March 4, 1891March 3, 1895).  He was defeated in 1894, running for a third term.

Lynch resumed his legal practice, but suffered from Bright's disease.  In May 1898, he died of the disease at his summer home in Pelican Lake, Wisconsin.

Personal life and family
Thomas Lynch married Winnifred Finucane on November 2, 1867.  They had at least 10 children, though at least seven of those died in childhood.  They were members of the Catholic Church.  It's not clear if any of his children survived him.

Electoral history

Wisconsin Assembly (1872)

| colspan="6" style="text-align:center;background-color: #e9e9e9;"| General Election, November 5, 1872

Wisconsin Assembly (1882)

| colspan="6" style="text-align:center;background-color: #e9e9e9;"| General Election, November 7, 1882

U.S. House of Representatives (1890, 1892, 1894)

References

External links

|-

1844 births
1898 deaths
People from Chilton, Wisconsin
Politicians from Milwaukee
People from Antigo, Wisconsin
University of Wisconsin Law School alumni
Wisconsin Independents
County officials in Wisconsin
Mayors of places in Wisconsin
Members of the Wisconsin State Assembly
Democratic Party members of the United States House of Representatives from Wisconsin
19th-century American politicians